Once Upon a Time in Jamaligudda  is a 2022 Indian Kannada-language romantic drama film written and directed by Kushal Gowda, and produced by Sri Hari under Niharika Movies banners. The film stars Dhananjaya and Aditi Prabhudeva in pivotal roles.  The music is composed by Arjun Janya. Once Upon a Time in Jamaligudda was released on 30 December 2022 and received positive reviews from critics.

Plot 
Chukki (Praanya P Rao) narrates the story of her childhood, set in the 90s, which includes time spent with her uncle, Hiroshima aka Krishna (Dhananjaya). Hiroshima is in love with Rukku (Aditi Prabhudeva), who works in a massage parlour. But their love story leads to chaos. Then, a murder changes the course of their lives. How they manage to come out of this mess forms the rest of the story.

Cast 
Dhananjaya as Heroshima aka Krishna
Aditi Prabhudeva as Rukmini aka Rukku
Yash Shetty as Nagasaki
Praanya P Rao as Chukki
Triveni Rao as SI Roopa
Prakash Belawadi as Police Officer 
Bhavana

Release
The film was released on 30 December 2022 in theatres.

References 

Indian drama films
2020s Kannada-language films
2022 films
Films shot in Karnataka
2022 drama films